Pauline Musgrave (born 25 July 1936) is a British former swimmer. She competed in the women's 400 metre freestyle at the 1952 Summer Olympics.

She married Alan Clarkson.

References

1936 births
Living people
British female swimmers
Olympic swimmers of Great Britain
Swimmers at the 1952 Summer Olympics
Place of birth missing (living people)
British female freestyle swimmers
20th-century British women